Chobienia  is a village (former town) in the administrative district of Gmina Rudna, within Lubin County, Lower Silesian Voivodeship, in south-western Poland.

The village has a population of 650.

Chobienia is the site of a Renaissance castle, where Frederick II of Prussia stayed after the Battle of Kunersdorf in 1759.

Notable people 
Johann Heermann (1585–1647), hymn composer, worked as a pastor in Köben from 1611.

Chobienia
Former populated places in Lower Silesian Voivodeship